JRO may refer to:
 J. Robert Oppenheimer (1904–1967), American physicist known for his work with the Manhattan Project
 Jet and Replication Objects library; see Microsoft Data Access Components
 Jicamarca Radio Observatory, an observatory
 Kilimanjaro International Airport, in Tanzania